Saints Peter and Paul Church in Brzeg, Poland, is a historic Gothic Franciscan basilica built in the thirteenth-century.

The church was built in the thirteenth-century, subsequently expanded in 1338, and transformed after a fire in the sixteenth-century. In 1527, after Frederick II of Legnica introduced Lutheranism into Brzeg, the town's Franciscans were expelled, with the basilica acquired by the town authorities. In 1582, the building was rebuilt into an arsenal. The fire service moved into the building the nineteenth-thirties. After the Great Flood of 1997, the basilica's tower, together with some of its walls collapsed. Since 2001, the basilica has undergone renovation works, with the Roman Catholic Archdiocese of Wrocław acquiring the church in 2003. In 2013, the archdiocese received funds of zl 1,700,000 from the Ministry of Culture and National Heritage of Poland to rebuild the roof and rebuild the basilica's Gothic windows.

See also
St. Nicholas' Church, Brzeg
Holy Cross Church, Brzeg

References

Brzeg County
Basilica churches in Poland
Brzeg